The Schoolgirl's Diary (or The Journal of a Schoolgirl) is a 2007 North Korean film directed by Jang In-hak. It debuted at the 2006 Pyongyang Film Festival as one of two films produced domestically that year, and was released in France at the end of 2007. In 2016, Radio Free Asia, a U.S. government-funded agency, claimed that the film had been banned in North Korea. However, this was proven false, as the film has been broadcast on North Korean state television KCTV  and archived on the state-controlled news website Uriminzokkiri.

Plot 
The film depicts a North Korean teenager's struggle to understand her father's devotion to his country, and to scientific achievement at the expense of his own family's happiness. Spending the vast majority of his time at work as a computer engineer in a distant town, he leaves his two daughters, wife, and mother-in-law to live in their dilapidated rural home. In questioning her father's values, the rebellious teen begins to defy her mother, a hardworking librarian who spends her evenings translating scientific articles for her absentee husband.

The protagonist realizes how selfish she has been only after her father makes a major breakthrough in his scientific research and is lavished with praise for his self-sacrifice and devotion to the state.

References

External links 
 
 

2007 films
2007 drama films
2000s Korean-language films
North Korean drama films
2006 drama films
2006 films